UFC 220: Miocic vs. Ngannou was a mixed martial arts event produced by the Ultimate Fighting Championship that was held on January 20, 2018, at TD Garden in Boston, Massachusetts.

Background
A UFC Heavyweight Championship bout between current champion Stipe Miocic and Francis Ngannou served as the event headliner.

The event also featured a UFC Light Heavyweight Championship bout between current champion Daniel Cormier and Volkan Oezdemir.

A welterweight bout between The Ultimate Fighter: American Top Team vs. Blackzilians welterweight winner Kamaru Usman and Emil Weber Meek was originally scheduled for UFC 219. However, due to an alleged visa issue for Meek which affected his travel schedule, the pairing was delayed and then rescheduled for this event. However, it was shifted to UFC Fight Night: Stephens vs. Choi a day later, which took place six days before this event.

A welterweight bout between Abdul Razak Alhassan and Sabah Homasi was originally scheduled for UFC 219, but later shifted to this event. The pairing met previously at UFC 218, when Alhassan won via a controversial TKO.

Charles Rosa was expected to face promotional newcomer Dan Ige at the event. However, on December 22, Rosa pulled out due to a neck injury. Ige remained on the card and faced fellow newcomer Julio Arce.

Arnold Allen was expected to face The Ultimate Fighter: Latin America 2 lightweight winner Enrique Barzola at the event. However, Allen was pulled from the fight on January 11 due to alleged visa issues which restricted his ability to travel. He was replaced by promotional newcomer Matt Bessette.

Jamie Moyle was expected to face Maryna Moroz at the event. However, Moyle pulled out of the fight during the week leading up to the event citing an undisclosed injury. In turn, promotion officials indicated that Moroz would be rescheduled for a future event.

Results

Bonus awards
The following fighters were awarded $50,000 bonuses:
Fight of the Night: Calvin Kattar vs. Shane Burgos
Performance of the Night: Daniel Cormier and Abdul Razak Alhassan

Reported payout
The following is the reported payout to the fighters as reported to the Massachusetts Office of Consumer Affairs and Business Regulation. It does not include sponsor money and also does not include the UFC's traditional "fight night" bonuses. The total disclosed payout for the event was $2,551,000.
 Stipe Miocic: $600,000 (no win bonus) def. Francis Ngannou: $500,000
 Daniel Cormier: $500,000 (no win bonus) def. Volkan Oezdemir: $350,000
 Calvin Kattar: $28,000 (includes $14,000 win bonus) def. Shane Burgos: $22,000
 Gian Villante: $100,000 (includes $50,000 win bonus) def. Francimar Barroso: $27,000 
 Rob Font: $60,000 (includes $30,000 win bonus) def. Thomas Almeida: $36,000
 Kyle Bochniak: $24,000 (includes $12,000 win bonus) def. Brandon Davis: $10,000
 Abdul Razak Alhassan: $40,000 (includes $20,000 win bonus) def. Sabah Homasi: $12,000
 Dustin Ortiz: $60,000 (includes $30,000 win bonus) def.  Alexandre Pantoja: $14,000
 Julio Arce: $20,000 (includes $10,000 win bonus) def. Dan Ige: $10,000
 Enrique Barzola: $42,000 (includes $21,000 win bonus) def. Matt Bessette: $12,000
 Islam Makhachev: $32,000 (includes $16,000 win bonus) def. Gleison Tibau: $50,000

See also
List of UFC events
List of current UFC fighters
2018 in UFC

References

Ultimate Fighting Championship events
Events in Boston
2018 in Boston
2018 in mixed martial arts
2018 in sports in Massachusetts
January 2018 sports events in the United States
Mixed martial arts in Massachusetts
Sports competitions in Boston